The 1909–10 Georgetown Hoyas men's basketball team represented Georgetown University during the 1909–10 NCAA Division I college basketball season. Maurice Joyce coached the team in his third season as head coach. Georgetown was an independent and for the last time played its home games at the Odd Fellows Hall at 8th and D Streets NW  in downtown Washington, D.C. The team finished the season with a record of 5–7.

Season recap

Georgetown University Law School student and forward Fred Rice completed his third and final season with the Hoyas. Injuries limited him to seven games, in which he scored 13 field goals and seven free throws for a total of 33 points and a 4.7-point-per-game average. He completed his 28-game Georgetown career with 247 points, and his 8.8-point-per-game average was the fifth highest among Georgetown players prior to World War II.

Sophomore forward-center Frank Schlossers offensive production dropped from the previous year, but he nonetheless led the team in scoring for the second straight year. He played in 10 games and scored 67 points, averaging 6.7 points per game.

The team finished with a record of 5–7, the only losing record in Joyces four-year tenure as head coach and, in fact, the only losing season in the first 19 seasons of Georgetown men's basketball history. The next losing season would not come until the 1925-26 team finished at 5–8.

Roster
Sources

Georgetown players did not wear numbers on their jerseys this season. The first numbered jerseys in Georgetown mens basketball history would not appear until the 1933-34 season.

Forward and team captain James Colliflower, a Georgetown University Law School student and three-season letterman in his last year playing with the team, would later serve as Georgetowns head coach during the 1911-12, 1912-13, 1913-14, and 1921-22 seasons.

1909–10 schedule and results
Sources

It was common practice at this time for colleges and universities to include non-collegiate opponents in their schedules, with the games recognized as part of their official record for the season, and the games against Baltimore Medical College and the Washington YMCA all counted as part of Georgetowns won-loss record for 1909–10. It was not until 1952, after the completion of the 1951–52 season, that the National Collegiate Athletic Association (NCAA) ruled that colleges and universities could no longer count games played against non-collegiate opponents in their annual won-loss records.

Georgetown lost at Navy this season, the first of 15 straight losses to the Midshipmen. Georgetowns next victory over Navy would not take place until 1928.

|-
!colspan=9 style="background:#002147; color:#8D817B;"| Regular Season

References

Georgetown Hoyas men's basketball seasons
Georgetown
Georgetown Hoyas men's basketball team
Georgetown Hoyas men's basketball team